The Kissimmee Air Museum was located at the Kissimmee Gateway Airport in Kissimmee, Florida.  It housed vintage aircraft from World War II to the Vietnam War including an outdoor showroom. It was a working museum that restored vintage aircraft. In 2021, the Kissimmee Air Museum closed when the associated Warbird Adventures, Inc moved their operation to Ninety Six, South Carolina.

When the Flying Tigers Warbird Restoration Museum closed in 2004 due to Hurricane Charley, Warbird Adventures, Inc. saw a need for a museum and opened the Kissimmee Air Museum in 2007.

Exhibits
The museum displayed a number of vintage aircraft owned by the associated Warbird Adventures, Inc. as well as on loan from private individuals and other organizations.

Operational aircraft
Boeing Stearman N2S-5
Cessna L-19
Fouga Magister
Grumman S-2 Tracker
Hiller OH-23 Raven
North American P-51 Mustang
North American T-6 Texan
Robinson R44
PZL TS-11 Iskra
Taylor Aerocar

Aircraft under restoration
Boeing Stearman PT-17
Mikoyan-Gurevich MiG-17F
PZL TS-11 Iskra

Aircraft engines
de Havilland Goblin
General Electric CJ610
Kinner R-5
Klimov VK-1
Rolls-Royce Griffon

See also
List of aviation museums

Notes

External links

 Warbird Adventures

Aerospace museums in Florida
Buildings and structures in Kissimmee, Florida
Military and war museums in Florida
Museums in Osceola County, Florida
Kissimmee